Qu Yi may refer to:

Quyi, traditional Chinese storytelling and oral narrative arts
Qu Yi (general) ( 190s), general under the warlord Yuan Shao during the late Han dynasty
Qu Yi (actor) (born 1992), Chinese musical actor